Larsons Landing is a steamer landing on the northwest shore of Okeover Inlet, which is the upper end of Malaspina Inlet in the Sunshine Coast region of British Columbia, Canada.

References

Sunshine Coast (British Columbia)
Unincorporated settlements in British Columbia